The Section Quartet is a string quartet founded by Eric Gorfain that performs cover versions of rock songs.

History
Eric Gorfain founded the quartet after working for the 1996 tour of Robert Plant and Jimmy Page. He said the quartet fulfilled his desire to play lead guitar in a rock band. The debut album, No Electricity Required (2004), contained Gorfain's arrangement of "Dazed and Confused" by Led Zeppelin in addition to cover versions of songs by Coldplay, Kiss, Iron Maiden, and Queens of the Stone Age.

The Section Quartet consists of Gorfain on violin, Daphne Chen on violin, Richard Dodd on cello, and Leah Katz on viola. They have performed on soundtracks and pop music albums, such as Stripped (RCA, 2002) by Christina Aguilera. Their performance on "Beautiful" impressed the songwriter, Linda Perry. She produced the quartet's album Fuzzbox (2007) for Decca Records.

Discography
 No Electricity Required (2004)
 Lizards Like Us (2006)
 Fuzzbox (Decca, 2007)

As guest
 1993: The Nightmare Before Christmas, Danny Elfman
 2002: Stripped, Christina Aguilera
 2003: Underworld
 2003: The Nurse Who Loved Me, A Perfect Circle
 2004: A Boot and a Shoe, Sam Phillips
 2004: Into the Now, Tesla
 2005: Octane, Spock's Beard
 2007: Graduation, Kanye West
 2007: Reba: Duets, Reba McEntire
 2007: Smokey Rolls Down Thunder Canyon, Devendra Banhart
 2007: Southland Tales
 2007: Strange Weirdos, Loudon Wainwright III
 2008: Recovery, Loudon Wainwright III
 2014: Goddess, Banks
 2015: Coming Forth by Day, Cassandra Wilson
 2016: The Altar, Banks
 2017: Revival, Eminem
 2017: Villains, Queens of the Stone Age

References

External links
 Official Website

American string quartets
Musical groups established in 1998